Events in the year 1992 in Germany.

Incumbents
President – Richard von Weizsäcker
Chancellor – Helmut Kohl

Events
 February 13–24 - 42nd Berlin International Film Festival
 March 30: Germany in the Eurovision Song Contest 1992
 April 13: The 5.3  Roermond earthquake affects Netherlands, Germany, and Belgium with a maximum Mercalli intensity of VII (Very strong).
 June 13-September 20: Documenta 9
 July 6–8: The 18th G7 summit is held in Munich.
 August 22–24: Rostock-Lichtenhagen riots.
 September 17: The Mykonos restaurant assassinations occur in Berlin.
 October 1 - Tom & Jerry: The Movie is released to theaters.
 Date unknown - The Scientology Task Force of the Hamburg Interior Authority is formed.

Sport

 1991–92 Bundesliga
 1991–92 2. Bundesliga
 1991–92 ice hockey Bundesliga season
 1992 ATP German Open
 1992 BMW Open
 1992 German Grand Prix
 1992 German motorcycle Grand Prix
 1992 DTM season
 Germany at the 1992 Summer Olympics
 Germany at the 1992 Winter Olympics

Film

 42nd Berlin International Film Festival
 5th European Film Awards

Music

 Germany in the Eurovision Song Contest 1992

Births

January 5 – Julian Derstroff, German footballer
February 1 - Stefan Bötticher, German cyclist
February 15 - Peter Kretschmer, German canoeist
March 4 - Bernd Leno, German footballer
March 9 - Mateusz Przybylko, German high jumper
April 17 - Shkodran Mustafi, German footballer
April 29 - Alina Rosenberg, German Paralympic equestrian
April 30 - Marc-André ter Stegen, German footballer
May 2 - Vanessa Mai, German singer
June 3 - Mario Götze, German footballer
June 9 - Pietro Lombardi, German singer and winner of Deutschland sucht den Superstar (season 8)
July 2 - Tatjana Pinto, German athlete
July 22 - Carolin Schnarre, German Paralympic equestrian
August 3 - Gesa Felicitas Krause, German athlete
August 6 - Mathias Brugger, German athlete
September 2 - Konrad Abeltshauser, German ice hockey player
October 12 – Cüneyt Köz, footballer
October 15 - Sarah Lombardi, German singer and runner-up of Deutschland sucht den Superstar (season 8)
November 28 - Emilia Schüle, German actress

Deaths

13 January – Josef Neckermann, equestrian and businessman (born 1912)
31 January - Martin Held, actor (born 1908)
6 February – Felix Rexhausen, journalist (born 1932)
12 March - Heinz Kühn, German politician (born 1912)
1 April - Walter Andreas Schwarz, German singer, songwriter (born 1913)
6 May – Marlene Dietrich, German-American actress (born 1901)
30 May - Karl Carstens, German politician, former President of Germany (born 1914)
3 June - Wilfried Dietrich, German wrestler (born 1933)
14 June - Thomas Nipperdey, German historian (born 1927)
19 July - Heinz Galinski, President of Central Council of Jews in Germany (born 1912)
10 August - Kurt A. Körber, German entrepreneur (born 1909)
1 October
Gert Bastian, politician (born 1923)
Petra Kelly, politician (born 1947)
8 October – Willy Brandt, German politician, former Chancellor of Germany (born 1913)
22 October - Wolf Kaiser, actor (born 1916)
9 November- Fritz Gunst, water polo player (born 1908)

See also
1992 in German television

References

 
Years of the 20th century in Germany
1990s in Germany
Germany
Germany